The 1929 NCAA Wrestling Championships were the 2nd NCAA Wrestling Championships to be held. Ohio State University in Columbus, Ohio hosted the tournament at the Ohio Expo Center Coliseum.

Oklahoma A&M took home the team championship with 26 points with four individual champions.

Team results

Individual finals

References

NCAA Division I Wrestling Championship
Wrestling competitions in the United States
1929 in American sports
1929 in sports in Ohio
Wrestling in Ohio